This is a list of current United States Marine Corps battalions, sorted by the mission they perform.


Active units

Ground Combat Element battalions

The ground combat element (GCE) consists of those combat and combat support units whose primary mission is to, (1) engage with and destroy the enemy by fire and/or maneuver, and/or shock effect, performed by infantry, field artillery, and tank units, (2) provide close battlefield support to other GCE units by assault amphibian, combat assault, light armored reconnaissance, reconnaissance, and combat engineer units, or (3) provide immediate command and control, and limited logistical support including consolidated Navy personnel administration and motor transport (medium truck) support to subordinate GCE battalions and regiments (infantry and artillery only) by Marine division (MARDIV) headquarters battalions. Additionally, this battalion provides communications networking and law enforcement support across the GCE. The headquarters battalion also includes the division band, whose tactical mission is to serve as a provisional rifle platoon in providing division headquarters security.

Note: Some GCE battalions and regiments are provided air liaison officers/forward air controllers (i.e., Marine Corps naval aviators — aircraft pilots, and naval flight officers — airborne weapons and sensor systems officers) with specialized skills in coordinating air support of ground units) from the Marine Aircraft Wing (MAW) of the aviation combat element (ACE). These officers facilitate employment of Marine aviation in support of GCE units to perform offensive air support (e.g., close air support), assault support (e.g., troop, cargo, and casualty transport, aerial command and control, liaison, communications, and illumination, and close-in fire support by light/attack helicopters), and aerial reconnaissance (e.g., tactical reconnaissance and artillery spotting).

Infantry battalions
Infantry battalions are the heart and soul of the ground combat element. The mission of locating, closing with, and destroying the enemy with fire and maneuver and repelling the enemy's assault with fire and close combat lies with the "grunts". Marine infantry battalions often have limited organic equipment outside of small arms, infantry crew-served weapons (e.g., heavy machine guns, medium mortars, and anti-tank missiles), and a few light tactical trucks. Marine infantry primarily maneuvers by foot as light infantry, and must be supplemented with additional trucks to become motorized infantry or Amphibious Assault Vehicles to become mechanized infantry.

A Marine infantry battalion is usually organized into three rifle companies, a weapons company, and a headquarters and service company. The rifle company has a company headquarters, three rifle platoons, with three rifle squads each, and a weapons platoon with medium machineguns, mortars, and assault weapons sections. The weapons company includes a company headquarters, a heavy machinegun platoon, an 81mm mortar platoon, and an antiarmor platoon. Sometimes, the commander will mix these into Combined Anti-Armor Teams. The headquarters and service company includes all command, administration, intelligence, operations, logistics, and communication Marines and equipment, as well as the battalion's  Scout Sniper platoon and Battalion Aid Station (BAS) staffed by U.S. Navy Hospital Corpsman.  By 2030 three battalions will be disbanded, and some reflagged: 1/8th becoming 2/2nd, 2/8th becoming 4/6th, 8th Marine HQ and 3rd Btn disband.

Artillery battalions
Field artillery units provide indirect, long-range cannon and rocket fire support for the Marine Air-Ground Task Force.
Currently, artillery regiments contain two or three (11th Marines only) cannon battalions and are equipped with the M777 lightweight, towed, 155 mm, medium howitzer and the Expeditionary Fire Support System (EFSS) 120 mm, heavy mortar. Two regiments (11th Marines and 14th Marines) also have one rocket battalion equipped with the M142 High Mobility Artillery Rocket System (HIMARS) equipped with the MGM-140 ATACMS surface-to-surface, guided missile.
Marine artillery battalions contain a Headquarters Battery and three or four firing batteries.
Firing batteries contain a headquarters platoon (including a liaison section with three forward observer teams) and one or two firing platoons (depending upon weapons systems). The firing platoon(s) contain a battery operations center, a fire direction center, and four or six artillery sections (depending upon weapon system). Counter-battery radar is usually a regimental asset, but can be detached to augment battalions or batteries.  By 2030 all but five artillery batteries will be disbanded.

Armor battalions
The mission of an armor unit is to conduct and support amphibious operations and other operations as required by landing and transporting to inland objectives the surface assault elements and their equipment, and by conducting light armored reconnaissance and limited offensive and defensive operations. When task-organized with infantry, tanks, and other forces, the battalion conducts combined arms operations as a separate maneuver element in support of the Marine Division.

Currently, Assault Amphibian (AA) battalions utilize the Amphibious Assault Vehicle (AAVP-7A1) and consist of a headquarters and service company and two to six AA companies. Each AA company is equipped with 42 AAVs (including personnel, command, and recovery variants) organized into three platoons of 12 AAVs each and an additional six AAVs in the company headquarters. Each AA platoon is capable of transporting an entire Marine rifle company plus any dismounted attachments (e.g., mortar forward observer teams, anti-tank missile crews, scout/sniper or reconnaissance squads) thus transforming into amphibious/mechanized infantry. (One AA company is capable of transporting the assault echelon of a Marine infantry battalion.)  Although plans were in place to replace it with the Expeditionary Fighting Vehicle, the cancellation of the program is going to prolong use of the AAV.

Light Armored Reconnaissance (LAR) battalions use the LAV 25 series of vehicles and consist of a headquarters and service company and four LAR companies. Each LAR company is equipped with 25 LAVs (including 14 LAV-25, two mortar, four anti-tank, one command & control, three logistics, and one recovery variant).

Combat Engineer battalions
The mission of combat engineers is to provide mobility, counter mobility, survivability, and limited general engineering support.
Mobility includes the assessment and fortification of roadways and bridges, the clearing of enemy obstacles and landmines, and assault breaching. Counter mobility includes creating obstacles and barriers for the enemy, which could include the destruction of structures and/or bridges. Survivability includes the fortification of positions and the construction of new outposts. Other jobs can include Explosive Ordnance Disposal (EOD), construction, and utilities (such as generators and refrigeration).
Currently, combat engineers use a variety of tools for their trade. Some vehicles include the M9 Armored Combat Earthmover, D7 Bulldozer, M60A1 Armored Vehicle Launched Bridge, and various cranes and forklifts. Each combat engineer battalion consists of a headquarters and service company, three combat engineer companies, one mobility assault company, and an engineer support company.

Reconnaissance battalions
The mission of the reconnaissance battalions is to obtain information by visual observation about the activities and resources of an enemy or potential enemy, or about the meteorologic, hydrographic, or geographic characteristics of a particular area. They specialize in amphibious recon, including hydrography; as well as airborne recon, infiltration via surface, subsurface and airborne operations, and conducting limited scale raids and ambushes. The battalions consist of a headquarters and service company and one to four reconnaissance companies (divisional assets, individual companies usually attached to an RCT). All battalions (except 4th Recon) also have a force reconnaissance company dedicated to provide deep reconnaissance and direct action capability to a MEF HQ. (Two additional separate force reconnaissance companies exist in the Marine Forces Reserve.)

Headquarters battalions
Headquarters battalions provide the command and control, administration and logistics for a Marine division.  Each MARDIV HQBN is uniquely organized to support its division. However, typically the battalion is commanded by a colonel, and consists of headquarters company (including the division band), communications company, truck company (2 in HQBN FIRSTMARDIV), and may include a military police company.

Logistics Combat Element battalions

The logistics combat element (LCE) consists of those combat service support units whose primary mission is to, (1) provide direct combat logistics (i.e., motor transport and landing support, and limited engineer support, equipment maintenance, and ground supply services) to specified GCE units or certain aviation combat element (ACE) units as provided by combat logistics battalions and separate combat logistics companies, (2) provide general combat service support across the Marine Air Ground Task Force (MAGTF) by specialized service support battalions, including: dental, engineer support, maintenance, medical, supply and transportation support battalions, or (3) provide immediate command and control, and consolidated Navy personnel administration to subordinate LCE battalions and regiments by the Marine Logistics Group (MLG) headquarters and service battalion. Additionally, this battalion provides communications networking and law enforcement support across the LCE.  The headquarters and service battalion also provides specialized services, including: military postal service, Marine Corps Exchange (MCX), and other personal services, to units of all four MAGTF elements (i.e., GCE, ACE, LCE, and CE).

Combat Logistics battalions
Combat logistics battalions (CLB) provide combat service support for the GCE and ACE beyond their organic capabilities. The battalions primarily provide motor transport and logistics control and materiel handling (i.e., landing support) services, and limited engineer, maintenance, and supply services, to dedicated Regimental Combat Teams (RCT) or Marine Expeditionary Units (MEU). CLBs that support RCTs typically consist of a headquarters and service company, and three support companies (engineer, maintenance, and transportation); those CLBs that support MEUs typically consist of several functional units (individual units may be styled as either a section, platoon, detachment, or company depending upon the size of unit, function, and the unit's parent battalion/regiment/group). In addition to a headquarters and service unit, these CLBs contain units dedicated to providing: air delivery, communications, engineer, explosive ordnance disposal, health services (medical and dental), landing support, law enforcement (military police), maintenance, motor transport, and supply support to the MEU.

Maintenance battalions
Maintenance battalions provide intermediate level (3d and 4th echelon) maintenance support for Marine Corps furnished (vice Navy, other service, or contractor provided) tactical ordnance (i.e., weapons and weapons systems), engineer, motor transport, communication-electronics, and general support (e.g., generators, refrigeration systems, water purification) equipment of the Marine Expeditionary Force (MEF). Maintenance battalions are usually organized with a headquarters and service company and five maintenance companies (electronic, engineer, general support, ordnance, and motor transport).

Engineer Support battalions
Engineer support battalions provide engineer support past the level available from organic engineers, such as combat bridging. ESBs also provide the storage and distribution of water and bulk fuels. Engineer support battalions usually consist of a headquarters and service company, three engineer companies, an engineer support company, a bridge company, a bulk fuel company, and an explosive ordnance disposal company.

Landing Support battalions
Landing support battalions support distributed maritime operations and expeditionary advanced base operations.

Supply battalions
Supply battalions provide supply support past that of organic unit supply. They provide all assets that a Marine unit might need, excepting fuels, water, and aviation repair parts provided from the Navy. Rations, repair parts, ammunition, personal equipment, and even entire end items are all provided by or through the supply battalions. Supply battalions usually consist of a headquarters and service company, an ammunition company, a medical logistics company, and a supply company.

Transportation Support battalions
Transportation Support battalions provide the MEF with motor vehicle (truck) transportation and throughput support for the distribution of supplies, personnel, and equipment. The battalions consist of a headquarters and service company and three truck companies.

Medical battalions
Medical battalions provide medical care beyond the immediate care of unit corpsmen. Often, these units act as field hospitals when on deployment. In garrison, they supplement naval hospitals at various Marine Corps installations. Medical battalions are manned by primarily by Navy Medical Corps personnel and typically consist of a headquarters and service company and three surgical companies.

Dental battalions
Dental battalions are responsible for the oral health of Marines and Sailors within the MAGTF. On deployment, they can also be used to support field hospitals per Bureau of Medicine and Surgery Instruction, when not performing dental roles. In garrison, they run dental health clinics at various Marine installations. Dental battalions are manned primarily by Navy Dental Corps personnel and usually consist of a headquarters and service company and three dental companies.

Headquarters and Support battalion 
(The former H&S battalions of the 1st, 2nd, and 3rd MLGs—previously designated as Combat Logistics Regiments 17, 27, and 37, respectively—are now designated as "Headquarters Regiments")
Headquarters and Service battalion provides command and control, administration, communications, security, food service and data processing support to the Marine Logistics Group (MLG) and supporting services to the Marine Expeditionary Force (MEF) or two Marine Expeditionary Brigades (MEB) and MEF residual forces in expeditionary/amphibious operations and subsequent operations ashore. Support includes data processing, financial disbursing, postal, legal, Marine Corps Exchange (MCX) and consolidated Navy personnel administration to the MLG. The battalion typically consists of headquarters company, communications company, military police company, and service company.

Command Element units

The command element (CE) consists of those command and control, communications, intelligence, law enforcement, electronic warfare/signals intelligence/electronic intelligence, civil affairs, air/naval gunfire liaison, and force reconnaissance units that enable the MAGTF commander to effectively fight the GCE and ACE, with support from the LCE, to defeat the enemy and/or accomplish other assigned missions.
 
Note: U.S. Marine Corps organizational doctrine places communications, intelligence, and law enforcement battalions and their organic companies/detachments in the MAGTF headquarters group or CE. However, intelligence (i.e., ground intelligence) may also be considered as a GCE function (primarily located in the infantry battalion scout/sniper platoon) and communications and law enforcement may also be considered as logistics functions. Most GCE battalions and regiments, and ACE squadrons/battalions (LAAD), Marine aircraft groups (MAGs), and Marine air control groups (MACGs), contain some organic communications assets such as battalion and regimental communications platoons, MARDIV and MLG communications companies, and Marine wing communications squadrons. In addition, MARDIVs, Marine Aircraft Wings (MAWs), and MLGs also possess a limited organic law enforcement capability.

Communications battalions
Communications battalions provide communication support for the MAGTF as part of the MEF headquarters groups. They also perform networking and data services when deployed. The battalions typically consist of a headquarters and service company, three communications companies, and a support (maintenance) company.

Intelligence battalions
Intelligence battalions, attached to MEF headquarters groups, are to plan and direct, collect, process, produce and disseminate intelligence, and provide counterintelligence support. In addition to a headquarters and service company, the battalions consist of two to four military intelligence companies that perform battlefield surveillance, production and analysis, and counterintelligence/human intelligence.

Law Enforcement battalions

The LE battalions will be a force multiplier to the operating forces forward deployed by assisting in an array of missions from law enforcement, route regulation, humanitarian assistance, nonlethal weapons training, and military working dog employment. Each included "500 military police officers [sic] and dozens of dogs." (Note: As military units, each battalion contains only about 30 to 40 "officers," as the majority of the military police Marines are enlisted members and not officers. "Officers" as in any military organization, command the battalion and its organic companies and platoons and serve as staff officers in the battalion headquarters.) By 2030 all of the battalions will be disbanded following the re-organisation announcement.

Radio battalions
Radio battalions provide the MEF with tactical electronic warfare, as well as signals intelligence and electronic intelligence. The battalions consist of a headquarters and service company and three operations companies.

Network Battalions
Marine Corps network battalions are responsible for providing all aspects of security, operations, and protection for Department of Defense Information Networks from the enterprise at the service level, down to each individual warfighter.

Civil Affairs groups
Civil Affairs groups provide the capability to plan and execute civil military operations while serving as the liaison between military forces and civil authorities, the local population and non-governmental organizations. The groups conduct activities which enhance the relationship between the military and host nation personnel and organizations facilitated through application of civil affairs specialty skills in areas normally the responsibility of civil governments.

Other units
While these units are designated as companies, they are commanded by a Lt. Col. who is assisted by an executive officer and an executive staff (S-1, S-2, etc.). The company's organic platoons often operate independently and are normally commanded by a major (ANGLICO) or captain (FORECON).

Air Naval Gunfire Liaison companies (ANGLICO) provide Marine Air-Ground Task Force (MAGTF) commanders a liaison capability, with foreign area expertise, to plan, coordinate, and conduct terminal control of fires in support of joint, allied, and coalition forces. ANGLICO units are separate companies (i.e., not organic to a battalion or regiment) reporting directly to one of the three MEF HQ Groups (1st, 2nd, & 5th ANGLICO) or the Forces HQ Group, Marine Forces Reserve (3rd, 4th, and 6th ANGLICO).

Fleet Marine Force Reconnaissance (FORECON) companies provide Marine Air-Ground Task Force (MAGTF) commanders with deep reconnaissance and direct action capability. The FORECON companies of the three MEFs are organic to their respective divisional reconnaissance battalions and are under operational control of their parent MEF HQ Group. The 3rd and 4th FORECON companies are separate companies reporting directly to the Forces HQ Group, Marine Forces Reserve and are dedicated to supporting II MEF and I MEF, respectively, whenever a MEF's active duty FORECON company is not available.

Other battalions
With the exception of the Low Altitude Air Defense battalions, which are organic to the Marine Air Control Group (MACG) of a Marine Aircraft Wing (MAW), and are a component of the Aviation Combat Element (ACE) of a Marine Air Ground Task Force (MAGTF), the battalions in this section perform missions either within the Operating Forces of the Marine Corps but outside the MAGTF structure, or within the Supporting Establishment.

Marine Raider battalions
The Marine Raider battalions of the Marine Raider regiment provide the principal special operations combat capability of the Marine Corps Forces Special Operations Command in performing direct action, special reconnaissance, counter-terrorism, information operations, foreign internal defense, and unconventional warfare missions. The battalions consist of a headquarters and service company and four special operations companies.

Special Mission battalions and battalion equivalent organizations
These battalions and organizations perform a wide range of specialized missions including: (1) CBRNE Consequence Management, (2) interior security of United States diplomatic posts to provide protection for classified information and equipment vital to U.S. national security, (3) Signals Intelligence, Information Assurance, and National-Tactical Integration activities, (4) physical security of naval nuclear vessels and weapons, (5) special operations intelligence support, and (6) special operations administrative, logistics, communications, EOD, Military Working Dog, and other operations support.

Specialized Training battalions
These battalions provide advanced training (i.e., beyond the scope of initial training provided by the Recruit Training battalions, Officer Candidates School, or other pre-commissioning programs (e.g., US Naval Academy). The scope of training provided includes: (1) Training and educating newly commissioned or appointed officers ... with particular emphasis on the duties, responsibilities and warfighting skills required of a rifle platoon commander, (2) Military Occupation Specialty (MOS) training, and (3) individual and crew-served weapons and fieldcraft training for new Marines.

Recruit Training battalions
Provide reception, processing, and recruit training for enlisted personnel following initial entry into the Marine Corps. Provide training for Drill Instructors and officers entrusted with recruit training responsibilities. Recruit training battalions consist of a headquarters and service company and four recruit training companies.

Only the Marine Corps Recruit Depot Parris Island logos are listed below but only Recruit Training battalions Marine Corps Recruit Depot San Diego wikis show. The logos for Marine Corps Recruit Depot San Diego differ slightly; additionally, San Diego does not have a Fourth Recruit Training Battalion, as it is the only female recruit training battalion in the Marine Corps.

Disbanded units

Infantry Battalions

Marine defense battalions

1st Marine Parachute Regiment

1st Marine Raider Regiment

Tank battalions

Amphibian Tractor battalions

Armored Amphibian Tractor battalions

Other battalions

See also

Ground combat element
List of United States Marine Corps divisions
List of United States Marine Corps ground combat element regiments
List of vehicles of the United States Marine Corps
List of weapons of the U.S. Marine Corps
Logistics combat element
List of United States Marine Corps logistics groups
List of United States Marine Corps logistics regiments
List of United States Marine Corps Combat Logistics Companies
Aviation Combat Element
List of United States Marine Corps aircraft wings
List of United States Marine Corps aircraft groups
List of United States Marine Corps air control groups
List of United States Marine Corps aircraft squadrons
List of United States Marine Corps aviation support units

References
Notes

Bibliography

Web

Units of the United States Marine Corps

Battalions

Marine Corps Battalions